Ardyce Linn Gidley Bohlke (November 2, 1943 – February 19, 2013) was an American educator, speech pathologist, and politician.

Early life 
On November 2, 1943, Bohlke was born in Omaha, Nebraska. Her parents were Arthur William and Naomi Gidley.

Education 
In 1961 Bohlke graduated from Omaha Central High School. She graduated from University of Nebraska–Lincoln in 1965 and was a member of Pi Beta Phi Sorority.

Career 
Bohlke was a speech pathologist and served eight years on the Hastings, Nebraska school board.

In 1991, Governor Ben Nelson appointed Bohlke to the Nebraska State Legislature as a Democrat. She was subsequently elected in both 1992 and 1996 and served until 2001.

Personal life 
She married Jon Halsey Bohlke February 4, 1967. On February 19, 2013, Bohlke died from brain tumor in Hastings, Nebraska at age 69.

References 

1943 births
2013 deaths
Politicians from Omaha, Nebraska
People from Hastings, Nebraska
University of Nebraska–Lincoln alumni
Deaths from brain cancer in the United States
Women state legislators in Nebraska
Democratic Party Nebraska state senators
Speech and language pathologists
School board members in Nebraska
21st-century American women